This is a list of the extreme points of Lithuania: the points that are farther north, south, east or west than any other location, as well as the highest and lowest points.

Latitude and longitude 
Northern point: near former Lemkinė village on the shores of Nemunėlis in the Biržai district municipality 
Southern point: in the Varėna district municipality, in uninhabitable forest area, cadastrally belonging to village Musteika.  The southernmost habitable place is in the village Ašašninkai, so called fraction Plaskiniškės.
Eastern point: near Vosiūnai village in the Ignalina district municipality 
Western point: Nida

Altitude 
 Lowest point: Rusnė Island (-.27 m) 
 Highest point: Aukštojas Hill (294 m)

See also 
 Extreme points of Europe
 Extreme points of Earth

References

Lists of coordinates
Lithuania
Extreme points